Quest for Fire is the second studio album by American record producer Skrillex, released on February 17, 2023, through Owsla and Atlantic Records. It follows his 2014 album Recess and was preceded by the singles "Rumble" (with Fred Again and Flowdan), "Leave Me Like This" (with Bobby Raps), and "Xena" (with Nai Barghouti). It also includes collaborations with Aluna, Eli Keszler, Pete Wentz, Starrah, Swae Lee, Noisia, Dylan Brady, Four Tet, Missy Elliott, Mr. Oizo, Porter Robinson and Bibi Bourelly.

Skrillex released his third album, Don't Get Too Close, on February 18, a day after Quest for Fire.

Promotion
The album was first teased when Skrillex uploaded a teaser video titled "QFF/DGTC 23" across his social media on January 1, 2023. Following the release of three singles across January and early February, Skrillex announced the album on February 11, 2023, also uploading a DJ set of modified tracks from the album filmed in his basement on his YouTube channel the same day.

Singles
Along with including the announced lead single "Rumble" (with Fred Again and Flowdan), as well as the subsequent 2023 singles "Leave Me Like This" (with Bobby Raps) and "Xena" (with Nai Barghouti), the track list features Skrillex's 2021 singles "Butterflies" (with Starrah and Four Tet), a remix of "Too Bizarre" (with Swae Lee and Siiickbrain) and "Supersonic (My Existence)" (with Noisia, Josh Pan and Dylan Brady). "Ratata" featuring Missy Elliott and Mr. Oizo is set to be released as a single; it includes an interpolation of Elliott's 2002 song "Work It".

Critical reception

Quest for Fire received a score of 72 out of 100 at review aggregator Metacritic based on twelve critics' reviews, indicating "generally favorable" reception. Joe Muggs of The Arts Desk called the album "the most groove-based thing [Skrillex has] done" and "hyper-detailed, a sci-fi-psychedelic jungle of micro sounds and macro mutations", finding that "it successfully holds together crazed disparate elements". Writing for NME, Ben Jolley opined that Quest for Fire contains "bountiful genres" and that Skrillex's "return largely lives up to the hype" by "often channel[ing] nostalgia", but also after "covering so much ground" in terms of the genres and sounds explored, this "means the album lacks a clear narrative or overarching theme". The staff review from AllMusic claimed, "The tracks on Quest for Fire go for instant dancefloor gratification, but they're far more refined and nuanced than the brostep ragers that made Skrillex a household name in the early 2010s."

Alexis Petridis of The Guardian wrote that the album is "guest-laden eclecticism that walks the line between catchy and annoying" and includes "a bit of everything, from house and dubstep to two-step garage and Chicago juke", concluding that it "feels more like a crammed mood-board than an album". Isabel Armitage of Clash commented "we still get to hear the classic EDM sound palette in Quest For Fire as well as high tuned pop punk vocals that we have come to expect from Skrillex" on the album, concluding that it "features an eclectic mix sub cultures from niche areas of the world, with each song fluidly merging with the next whilst creating a new, unique sound". Writing for Pitchfork, Chal Ravens felt Quest for Fire "is a huge evolution from the brash, stadium-sized ragers of Skrillex 1.0. He's finally absorbed the fundamentals of dance music: basic stuff, like having a rhythm that makes you want to move your body."

Reviewing the album for The Telegraph, Ali Shutler expressed relief that Quest for Fire "doesn't sound like 2010 all over again", but that it "still blends urgent, bass-heavy peaks and drops with a near-constant sense of euphoria". Shutler described it as "still visceral EDM designed to get the pulse racing, but the whole thing has been given an ambitious refresh", calling it the "second coming of Skrillex". Writing for Sputnikmusic, Kirk Bowman questioned why Skrillex did not "do more with hyperpop or dariacore producers that clearly idolize him, or cash in on the many stars he's previously worked with who could have written more interesting songs for him", writing that while he "appreciate[s] the effort" that went into making the album "sound diverse and interesting", he could not "help but imagine how much farther [Skrillex] could have gone".

Track listing

Notes
  signifies an additional producer
  signifies an assistant producer
  signifies a vocal producer
  signifies an additional remixer

Sample credits
 "Leave Me Like This" contains a sample of "Caribbean Queen" by Billy Ocean
 "Ratata" contains a sample of "Positif" by Mr. Oizo.
 "Tears" samples both "I Never Knew" by Deborah Cox and "Hydrate" by Skrillex, Flowdan, Beam, and Peekaboo
 "Rumble" contains a sample of "Selecta" by Skrillex and Beam.
 "Inhale Exhale" contains a sample of "Alone With You" by Kito featuring AlunaGeorge.
 "Xena" contains a sample of "Ghandara" by Nai Barghouti.
 "Still Here (With the Ones That I Came With)" samples both "Time" by Snoh Aalegra, and "Painting Rainbows" by Skrillex and Bibi Bourelly.

Personnel
Musicians

 Skrillex – programming (all tracks), drum programming (1), all instruments (3, 5, 6, 8–14), vocals (14, 15)
 Joyryde – programming (1, 2, 6, 7), all instruments (1, 6)
 Nai Barghouti – additional vocals (1), vocals (8)
 Rachael Nedrow – additional vocals (1)
 Chris Lake – all instruments, programming (1)
 Bobby Raps – vocals (1)
 Carlos Sosa – saxophone (2)
 Missy Elliot – vocals (2)
 Mr. Oizo – vocals (2)
 Beam – additional vocals (3), vocals (4, 10)
 Meats (Salamimeats) – additional vocals (3)
 Joker – all instruments, programming, vocals (3)
 Sleepnet – all instruments, programming (3)
 Tom Norris – programming (3)
 Fred Again – all instruments (4)
 Elley Duhé – vocals (4)
 Flowdan – vocals (4, 10)
 Four Tet – all instruments, programming (5)
 Bibi Bourelly – vocals (5)
 Jamie xx – all instruments, programming (6)
 Aluna – vocals (6)
 Kito – vocals (6)
 Eli Keszler – live drums (7, 13), vocals (7)
 Rasha Mosa – additional vocals (8)
 Heavy Mellow – all instruments, programming (9)
 Posij – all instruments, programming (9)
 Rex Kudo – all instruments, programming (9)
 Swae Lee – vocals (9)
 Peekaboo – all instruments, programming (10)
 Rogét Chahayed – all instruments, programming (10)
 Pete Wentz – vocals (11)
 Starrah – vocals (12)
 Noisia – all instruments, programming (13)
 Dylan Brady – all instruments, programming (13)

Technical
 Skrillex – mixing (1–12, 14), mastering (3, 8–11, 14), engineering (all tracks)
 Joyryde – mixing, mastering (1, 2, 7)
 Joker – mixing, mastering, engineering (3)
 Four Tet – mixing (5)
 Peekaboo – mixing (10)
 ISOxo – mixing, mastering (12)
 Manny Marroquin – mixing (13)
 Luca Pretolesi – mastering (4)
 Mike Bozzi – mastering (5, 13)
 Bernie Grundman – mastering (5)
 Bobby Raps – engineering (1)
 Drew Gold – engineering (1, 2, 4–6, 9–12, 14)
 Sleepnet – engineering (3)
 Fred Gibson – engineering (4)
 Flowdan – engineering (10)

Charts

References

2023 albums
Albums produced by Fred Again
Albums produced by Kieran Hebden
Albums produced by Skrillex
Atlantic Records albums
Owsla albums
Skrillex albums